Volodymyr Yakimets (born 3 March 1998) is a professional Ukrainian football midfielder.

Career
Born in Zhydachiv Raion, Yakimets is a product of the FC Lviv School System, but in age 17 he transferred to FC Shakhtar and played for it in the Ukrainian Premier League Reserves and Under 19 Championship during 3 seasons. In July 2019 he signed 3 years deal with another Ukrainian Premier League club FC Karpaty.

He made his debut for FC Karpaty as a main-squad player in a home losing game against FC Dynamo Kyiv on 31 July 2019 in the Ukrainian Premier League.

References

External links

1998 births
Living people
Ukrainian footballers
Association football midfielders
FC Karpaty Lviv players
FC Lviv players
FC Kryvbas Kryvyi Rih players
Ukrainian Premier League players
Ukraine youth international footballers
Ukraine under-21 international footballers
Sportspeople from Lviv Oblast